Onton is a census-designated place located in Webster County, Kentucky. 
  

Onton is a census-designated place (CDP) in Webster County, Kentucky, United States.

Demographics

References

Census-designated places in Kentucky